Usad is a rural locality (a village) in Lyakhovskoye Rural Settlement, Melenkovsky District, Vladimir Oblast, Russia. The population was 207 as of 2010. There are 6 streets.

Geography 
Usad is located 33 km northeast of Melenki (the district's administrative centre) by road. Urvanovo is the nearest rural locality.

References 

Rural localities in Melenkovsky District
Melenkovsky Uyezd